Premiers Symptômes is the debut EP by French electronic music duo Air. It consists of singles issued between 1995 and 1997.

History
"Les professionnels" was later used as the basis of Air's 1998 single "All I Need".

Of 'Le soleil est près de moi', Nicolas Godin said: "It's the best song we ever did. It proves the best that you do isn't always the most successful. It came very naturally. The hard thing was finding a sentence to express the feeling we had. It was winter, so we wanted to have the sun near us. We did it in my living room before we were official artists, and we had so many problems with neighbours complaining about the noise of the Fender Rhodes. It was horrible."

Track listing
"Modular Mix" – 5:59
"Casanova 70" – 5:53
"Les professionnels" – 4:32 ("The Professionals")
"J'ai dormi sous l'eau" – 5:42 ("I Slept Under Water")
"Le soleil est près de moi" – 4:52 ("The Sun Is Close to Me")
1999 re-release bonus tracks
"Californie" – 2:27 ("California")
 "Brakes On" – 4:22
Remix of Alex Gopher's "Gordini Mix"
Alternately titled "Gordini Mix" (Brakes On mix) in some regions
Japanese bonus tracks
"Le soleil est près de moi" (Buffalo Daughter Remix) – 4:48
"Le soleil est près de moi" (Money Mark Remix) – 2:37

Personnel
 Air – production
 Jean-Benoit Dunckel - Fender Rhodes Piano, Organ, Solina Strings Ensemble, Korg MS20 and Mini Moog Synthesizers, Clavinet, Choir & Vocoder Effects
 Nicolas Godin - Bass, Solina Strings Ensemble, Mini Moog Synthesizer, Drums, Percussion, Samples, Sitar, Reverse Piano, Talk Box & Vocoder Effects, Fender Rhodes Piano, Guitars, Voice 
 Alex Gopher – reverse Rhodes (track 1)
 Xavier Jamaux – sampler (track 1)
 Eric Regert – organ (track 2)
 Etienne Wersinger – tambura (track 4)
 Patrick Woodcock – Euphonium (tracks 2–5); acoustic guitar (track 3)
 Stéphane Briat – mixing (tracks 2, 4, 5)
 Étienne de Crécy – production, mixing (tracks 1, 3)
 Alexandre Courtès – artwork
 Fabrice Lepicier – photography
 Sabotage! – design
 Guy Davie – mastering

Charts

Weekly charts

Certifications

As of 2001 it has sold 77,000 copies in United States according to Nielsen SoundScan.

References

External links
 

1997 debut EPs
Air (French band) albums
Virgin Records EPs